Carl Ellsworth is an American screenwriter, best known for writing Red Eye, Disturbia and The Last House on the Left.

Filmography

Television
Buffy the Vampire Slayer (1997)
Mowgli: The New Adventures of the Jungle Book (1998)
Mortal Kombat: Conquest (1998)
Animorphs (1998-1999)
Godzilla:The Series (2000) 
Xena: Warrior Princess (2000)
Cleopatra 2525 (2000-2001)
The Legend of Tarzan (2001)
Star Wars: The Clone Wars (2009-2010)

Film
Red Eye (2005) 
Disturbia (2007) 
The Last House on the Left (2009) 
Red Dawn (2012) 
Unhinged (2020)

References

External links

Living people
American male screenwriters
1972 births